Bruno Wolkowitch is a French actor born on 10 May 1961 in Paris, in the 11th arrondissement.

Biography
Bruno Wolkowitch (orig. Wołkowicz) is of Polish descent. His father was a tailor turned bookkeeper and his mother a beautician who became a dermatology assistant. He spent his childhood in Champigny-sur-Marne and then his adolescence in Saint-Maur-des-Fossés (Val-de-Marne).

He trained as an actor from 1981 to 1984 at Studio 34 with Claude Mathieu. In 1984, he was awarded a Diploma of Drama at the Conservatoire national supérieur d'art dramatique in Paris. From 1984 to 1987, he studied with Viviane Theophilides, Michel Bouquet and Jean-Pierre Vincent. At the same time, he entered the Comédie-Française.

He then appeared in numerous television films and gained notice with the television series Madame le maire in 1997 and PJ (Police judiciaire). In the latter series, Wolkowitch played Captain/Commander Vincent Fournier. He appeared in the first 100 episodes, from 1997 to March 2006 on France 2. Wolkowitch appeared in flashbacks for several seasons more.

In addition to his role as a field policeman, a pillar of the police station at PJ Saint-Martin, he continues to play other characters, notably that of Lagardère in a two-part television film, aired in 2003.

Besides television, he also performs in the theatre. In 2006, he starred in Miss Julie of August Strindberg, with Christine Citti – who played in the first two seasons of PJ – and Émilie Dequenne.

Bruno Wolkowitch is also passionate about photography.

In October 2015, on France Inter, the actor acknowledged having spent a very short stay in prison in Israel at the age of seventeen, to protect a friend on a narcotics-related charge. Since then, he has been barred from entering Israel.

He shares his life with the actress Fanny Gilles. They met in 2003 on the set of "PJ". They have a daughter, Lou, born in 2006, and a son, born in 2011.

Filmography

Acting

Films

Television

Short films

Dubbing

Directorial works

Music videos

Theatre

References

External links

 

Bruno Wolkowitch on the France 2 website 

French male voice actors
Troupe of the Comédie-Française
French National Academy of Dramatic Arts alumni
1961 births
Male actors from Paris
French people of Polish descent
Living people